The Alabama State League was a minor league baseball league that played between 1940 and 1950, with an interruption due to World War II. The Alabama State League was a Class D level league. The Alabama State League consisted of teams based exclusively in Alabama, evolving from and into the Alabama-Florida League, as that league added and reduced Florida based franchises.

History
In 1940, the Alabama-Florida League changed its name to the Alabama State League after the Florida based Panama City Pelicans franchise folded, leaving the league with only Alabama based franchises.  After two years, the league shut down due to World War II, but resumed activity in 1946. After another five years of operation, the Alabama-Florida name was brought back for the 1951 season, when the Panama City Fliers franchise joined the league. The Alabama State League was a Class D level league for its duration.

The Alabama State League began play as a six–team league in 1940, with the Andalusia Rams, Brewton Millers, Dothan Browns, Greenville Lions, Tallassee Indians and Troy Trojans as charter members.

Cities represented 
Andalusia, AL: Andalusia Rams 1940–1941; Andalusia Arrows 1947–1950 
Brewton, AL: Brewton Millers 1940–1941, 1946–1950 
Dothan, AL: Dothan Browns 1940–1941, 1946–1950
Enterprise, AL: Enterprise Boll Weevils 1947–1950
Geneva, AL: Geneva Red Birds 1946–1950 
Greenville, AL: Greenville Lions 1940–1941, 1946–1948; Greenville Pirates 1949–1950 
Headland, AL: Headland Dixie Runners 1950
Ozark, AL: Ozark Eagles 1946–1950
Tallassee, AL: Tallassee Indians 1940–1941
Troy, AL: Troy Trojans 1940; Troy Dodgers 1941; Troy Trojans 1946–1947; Troy Tigers 1948–1949 
Tuskegee, AL: Tuskegee Airmen 1941

Standings & statistics 
1940 Alabama State League
schedule
Playoffs: Greenville 3 games, Troy 2; Dothan 3 games, Tallassee 2.Finals: Dothan 4 games, Greenville 2. 
 
1941 Alabama State League
schedule
Troy (37–50) moved to Tuskegee July 31. Playoffs: Dothan 3 games, Andalusia 1; Tallassee 3 games, Brewton 1.Finals: Dothan 4 games, Tallassee 1. 

1946 Alabama State League
Playoffs: Geneva 3 games, Brewton 1; Greenville 3 games, Dothan 1.Finals: Geneva 3 games, Greenville 1. 
 
1947 Alabama State League
schedule
Playoffs: Greenville 4 games, Enterprise 3; Brewton 4 games, Dothan 3.Finals: Greenville 4 games, Brewton 3. 
 
1948 Alabama State League
Playoffs: Dothan 4 games, Troy 2; Greenville 4 games, Ozark 3.Finals: Dothan 4 games, Greenville 0. 
 
1949 Alabama State League
schedule
Playoffs: Greenville 4 games, Enterprise 1; Andalusia 4 games, Ozark 1.Finals: Andalusia 4 games, Greenville 1. 
 
1950 Alabama State League
Playoffs: Headland 4 games, Enterprise 3; Dothan 4 games, Greenville 2. Finals: Dothan 4 games, Headland 1.

References

Defunct minor baseball leagues in the United States
Baseball leagues in Alabama
Defunct professional sports leagues in the United States
Sports leagues established in 1940
Sports leagues disestablished in 1950
Sports leagues disestablished in 1941
Sports leagues established in 1947